Cornus is a commune in the Aveyron department in southern France.

Geography
The commune lies on the causse du Larzac.

The village lies in the valley of the Dèvre, a tributary of the Sorgues, which has its source in the commune.

Population

See also
Communes of the Aveyron department

References

Communes of Aveyron
Aveyron communes articles needing translation from French Wikipedia